Charles Lynn Hudson (born March 16, 1959) is an American former professional baseball starting pitcher, who played in Major League Baseball (MLB) for the Philadelphia Phillies, New York Yankees, and Detroit Tigers, from 1983 to 1989.

Early life
Hudson was born in Ennis, Texas and graduated from South Oak Cliff High School, before attending Prairie View A & M University (Texas A & M University System).

Baseball career

Philadelphia Phillies
Hudson was drafted in 1981 by the Philadelphia Phillies and joined the major league team in 1983. In the Fall of his rookie season, Hudson started two games in the 1983 World Series and was the losing pitcher in both games.

New York Yankees
In 1987, Hudson was traded to the New York Yankees for Tom Barrett and Mike Easler. He played for the Yankees for two seasons, then was traded again to the Detroit Tigers for Tom Brookens.

Detroit Tigers
In August 1989, Hudson, while driving drunk, crashed his Mercury Cougar into a telephone pole in a Detroit suburb. Hudson broke his left leg and his right knee needed reconstructive surgery. Hudson would later discuss how he began to drink as he struggled in his baseball career. Hudson was invited to spring training in 1995 by the Chicago Cubs.

References

External links

1959 births
Living people
African-American baseball players
Philadelphia Phillies players
New York Yankees players
Detroit Tigers players
Peninsula Pilots players
Helena Phillies players
Toledo Mud Hens players
Prairie View A&M Panthers baseball players
Portland Beavers players
Columbus Clippers players
Major League Baseball pitchers
Baseball players from Texas
People from Ennis, Texas
21st-century African-American people
20th-century African-American sportspeople